This is a list of female undisputed champions in professional boxing. Eras that aren't listed means that it doesn't have any undisputed champions.

Championship recognition 
Titles have been awarded by:
World Boxing Association (WBA), founded in 1921 as the National Boxing Association (NBA); re-named to the WBA in 1962
World Boxing Council (WBC), founded in 1963
International Boxing Federation (IBF), founded in 1983
World Boxing Organization (WBO), founded in 1988

Criteria 
2009-present, a boxer who holds the WBA, WBC, IBF and WBO world titles simultaneously

Heavyweight

To date, there has never been an undisputed champion in this division.

Super middleweight

WBA–WBC–IBF–WBO era

Middleweight

WBA–WBC–IBF–WBO era

Light middleweight

WBA–WBC era

WBA–WBC–IBF–WBO era

Welterweight

WBA–WBC era

WBA–WBC–IBF–WBO era

Light welterweight

WBA–WBC–IBF–WBO era

Lightweight

WBA–WBC–IBF–WBO era

Super featherweight

To date, there has never been an undisputed champion in this division.

Super bantamweight
To date, there has never been an undisputed champion in this division.

Bantamweight
To date, there has never been an undisputed champion in this division.

Super flyweight

To date, there has never been an undisputed champion in this division.

Flyweight

To date, there has never been an undisputed champion in this division.

Light flyweight
To date, there has never been an undisputed champion in this division.

Mini flyweight
To date, there has never been an undisputed champion in this division.

See also
List of current world boxing champions
List of WBA female world champions
List of WBC female world champions
List of IBF female world champions
List of WBO female world champions

References

External links

BoxRec Official Website
IBHOF website
World Titles (State Athletic Commission; pre-WBC)
National / World Boxing Association(1921 - )
International Boxing Federation(1983 - )
World Boxing Organization(1988 - )

Undisputed
Undisputed